Thumatha is a genus of moths in the family Erebidae. The genus was erected by Francis Walker in 1866. Species are distributed in the Oriental and Australian regions.

Description
Palpi porrect (extending forward) and slender. Antennae bipectinated (comb like on both sides) in male. Tibia with long spurs. Forewings are broad and short. Veins 3 to 5 arise closer to the end of the cell, and vein 6 from upper angle. Veins 7 to 9 stalked and vein 11 anastomosing (fusing) with vein 12. In hindwings, veins 3 and 4 stalked, vein 5 from angle of cell, veins 6 and 7 stalked, and vein 8 from beyond the middle of cell.

Species

 Thumatha brunnea Kühne, 2007
 Thumatha fuscescens Walker, 1866
 Thumatha fuscescens africana - Kühne, 2007
 Thumatha fuscescens fuscescens
 Thumatha kakamegae Kühne, 2007
 Thumatha inconstans (Butler, [1897])
 Thumatha infantula (Saalmüller, 1880)
 Thumatha lunaris Durante, 2007
 Thumatha monochroa Zolotuhin, 1996
 Thumatha muscula (Staudinger, 1887)
 Thumatha ochracea (Bremer, 1861)
 Thumatha orientalis Holloway, 2001
 Thumatha punctata Kühne, 2010
 Thumatha senex (Hübner, [1808])

References

 Kühne, L. (2007). Esperiana Buchreihe zur Entomologie Memoir 3: 353–394.
 
 Thalassia Salentina 30: 81–92.
 

Nudariina
Moth genera
Taxa named by Francis Walker (entomologist)